Night Raiders may refer to:

Night Raiders (1952 film), an American Western film directed by Howard Bretherton
Night Raiders (2021 film), a Canadian science fiction film directed by Danis Goulet

See also
 Night Raid (disambiguation)